Kinloch (from ) is a small town on the most northerly bay of Lake Taupō,  by road northwest of Taupō on the North Island Volcanic Plateau of New Zealand. It is in the Waikato region.

History
Sir Keith Holyoake, then the Deputy Prime Minister and Minister of Agriculture of New Zealand, purchased the land in 1953 in partnership with his friend Theodore Nisbet Gibbs and Gibbs' son Ian. The land, which had been purchased from Ngāti Tūwharetoa iwi in 1884, was a block of 5,385 acres largely covered in scrub and fern. In 1956 Holyoake's son purchased an additional 769-acre block of land to the west of the existing block, with additional lake frontage, from the Ngāti Tūwharetoa iwi. The land was originally named Whangamatā Station, but the town was renamed Kinloch partly to distinguish it from Whangamatā in the Bay of Plenty.

Kinloch was developed into a holiday destination. The first sections were sold in 1959 for between NZ£550 to NZ£1500 each. The Kinloch marina was built in 1962.

The town was extended by a large subdivision called "Holy Oaks" to the northwest in 2001, despite opposition from local residents and concerns about environmental impacts held by local iwi.

In December 2018, new town signs were installed that misspelled the town's name as "Kinlock". Replacement signs were installed in January 2019.

In February 2021, a lakefront three-bedroom house sold for 4.075 million, which was a record for the town.

In November 2022 public transport was introduced in Kinloch for the first time with the launch of the Connect2Taupō service, providing a weekly bus service from Kinloch to Taupō.

Recreation and community
Kinloch has a mixture of permanent residents and holiday makers. In 2013, 70% of Kinloch's houses were classified as holiday homes. The lake is used for trout fishing, alongside water-skiing and wakeboarding. Walking and cycling tracks include the Kawakawa to Kinloch (K2K) track.

The Kinloch Club golf course was designed by Jack Nicklaus and opened in March 2007. In 2018 the course was ranked as the best 18-hole course in New Zealand by the New Zealand Professional Golfers Association. Goody bags for attendees at the 67th Primetime Emmy Awards in 2015 included a stay at the course lodge. There is also a public 10-hole golf course located in Kinloch village.

Kinloch has a general store, a restaurant called the Tipsy Trout, and a café at the Kinloch Club golf course.

The Kinloch Triathlon has been held annually since 1985 and is New Zealand's longest running triathlon. 

The Kinloch Volunteer Fire Brigade services the area. It is an auxiliary brigade meaning it is run by Taupō's fire brigade.

Demographics
The settlement is part of the larger Mapara statistical area.

Kinloch had a population of 693 at the 2018 New Zealand census, an increase of 204 people (41.7%) since the 2013 census, and an increase of 363 people (110.0%) since the 2006 census. There were 291 households, comprising 348 males and 342 females, giving a sex ratio of 1.02 males per female, with 108 people (15.6%) aged under 15 years, 57 (8.2%) aged 15 to 29, 339 (48.9%) aged 30 to 64, and 180 (26.0%) aged 65 or older.

Ethnicities were 97.0% European/Pākehā, 7.4% Māori, 1.3% Pacific peoples, 0.9% Asian, and 1.3% other ethnicities. People may identify with more than one ethnicity.

Although some people chose not to answer the census's question about religious affiliation, 53.2% had no religion, 39.0% were Christian, 0.4% were Hindu and 1.3% had other religions.

Of those at least 15 years old, 111 (19.0%) people had a bachelor's or higher degree, and 87 (14.9%) people had no formal qualifications. 138 people (23.6%) earned over $70,000 compared to 17.2% nationally. The employment status of those at least 15 was that 270 (46.2%) people were employed full-time, 96 (16.4%) were part-time, and 12 (2.1%) were unemployed.

Mapara statistical area

Mapara had a population of 1,941 at the 2018 New Zealand census, an increase of 564 people (41.0%) since the 2013 census, and an increase of 903 people (87.0%) since the 2006 census. There were 729 households, comprising 954 males and 987 females, giving a sex ratio of 0.97 males per female. The median age was 46.9 years (compared with 37.4 years nationally), with 363 people (18.7%) aged under 15 years, 222 (11.4%) aged 15 to 29, 1,017 (52.4%) aged 30 to 64, and 339 (17.5%) aged 65 or older.

Ethnicities were 94.9% European/Pākehā, 9.1% Māori, 0.5% Pacific peoples, 1.4% Asian, and 2.5% other ethnicities. People may identify with more than one ethnicity.

The percentage of people born overseas was 18.4, compared with 27.1% nationally.

Although some people chose not to answer the census's question about religious affiliation, 56.7% had no religion, 33.1% were Christian, 0.3% had Māori religious beliefs, 0.2% were Hindu, 0.2% were Buddhist and 2.2% had other religions.

Of those at least 15 years old, 315 (20.0%) people had a bachelor's or higher degree, and 204 (12.9%) people had no formal qualifications. The median income was $38,600, compared with $31,800 nationally. 387 people (24.5%) earned over $70,000 compared to 17.2% nationally. The employment status of those at least 15 was that 822 (52.1%) people were employed full-time, 318 (20.2%) were part-time, and 30 (1.9%) were unemployed.

References

Populated places in Waikato
Taupō District
Populated places on Lake Taupō